The Arizona RoadRunners are a professional baseball team based out of Yuma, Arizona and are currently a member of the American Division of the Arizona Winter League, a short-season developmental program run by the North American League.  They are owned by Diamond Sports & Entertainment and will play their games, home and away, at Desert Sun Stadium in Yuma, Arizona, starting in 2011.

Team name
The team name once belonged to the St. George RoadRunners of the Golden Baseball League (which has since been absorbed into the new North American League).  The GBL RoadRunners played for four seasons from 2007 to 2010, before ownership, financial and stadium issues forced the team to fold after the 2010 season.  It is now shared with the newest NAL franchise, the Henderson RoadRunners from Henderson, Nevada.

The Arizona RoadRunners were added to the AWL along with the Long Beach Armada and Team Mexico with the Sonora Pilots returning to the league.  The AWL consists of some teams formerly identified as GBL franchises.  They now play in the American Division along with the Blythe Heat, Long Beach Armada, Somerton Stingers and Yuma Scorpions.

Season-by-season records
Arizona Winter League:

References

External links
 Arizona Winter League's official website
 Golden Baseball League

Arizona Winter League teams
Professional baseball teams in Arizona
Baseball teams established in 2011
2011 establishments in Arizona
Yuma, Arizona